John of Wallingford may refer to:

 John of Wallingford (d. 1214), English monk and abbot of St. Albans Abbey
 John of Wallingford (d. 1258), English monk and chronicler